Ab Bad or Abbad may refer to:
Abbad, Fars
Ab Bad, Fars
Ab Bad 2, Fars Province
Ab Bad, Faryab, Kerman Province
Ab Bad-e Chehel Tan
Ab Bad-e Kaleb Ali Khani
Ab Bad-e Pedari
Ab Bad-e Qahremani
Ab Bad-e Sivandi